Tell al-Dhiba'i, also spelled Tell edh-Dhiba'i, is an archaeological site in Baghdad Governorate (Iraq). It lies within the borders of modern Baghdad near Tell Muhammad and 3 kilometers northeast of Shaduppum (Tell Harmal), more specifically in the neighborhood of New Baghdad. Uzarzalulu has been proposed as the original name of the city. An alternative proposal is Šadlaš. The city was occupied mainly during the Isin-Larsa period and Old Babylonian period.

Archaeology
The site consists of three mounds covering a rectangular area of about 45000 square meters and rising to 7 meters. The highest mound is to the north. The Directorate-General of Antiquities of Iraq conducted three seasons of excavations, led by Muhammed Ali Mustafa, in 1947, 1962, and 1965. Before excavations began the site, being near Baghdad, had already been extensively dug by illegal workers in some areas in search of tablets and small finds. In the 1983-84 season the Iraqi State Organization for Antiquities and Heritage did some additional excavation on Old Babylonian houses there.

History
Five occupation layers were found on the central mound, underlain by scattered Akkadian Empire and Ur III period remains.  Level IV was marked by the remains large Kassite era foundations that cut into the lower level. The most significant level was Level V where roughly 100 cuneiform tablets and a temple (14.5 by 18.5 meters) of the god Lasimu were uncovered. The tablets were mainly administrative and loan contracts. Date formulas on tablets, including the death of Belakum, king of Eshnunna, show this level to date to the early period of the First Dynasty of Babylon. Most of the city rulers had Amorite names. Cylinder seals were also recovered. The northern and southern mounds had levels III, IV, and V with level III having a large building. The north mound produced a number of tablets and other finds. In total roughly 300 tablets were found at the site. An important discovery was a copper-smith operation including most of its tools. There are some Neo-Babylonian and Kassite graves at surface level of the site.

See also
Cities of the ancient Near East
IM 67118

References

Archaeological sites in Iraq